Acacia tratmaniana is a shrub belonging to the genus Acacia and the subgenus Juliflorae that is endemic to south western Australia.

Description
The sericeous branchlets have resinous ribs. Like many species of Acacia it has phyllodes rather than true leaves. The ascending or spreading phyllodes are shallowly to moderately incurved and quadrangular in cross section. It blooms from July to September producing yellow flowers.

Distribution
It is native to an area in the Wheatbelt region of Western Australia where it is often situated on rocky ridges, flats and salt flats where it grows in sandy or sandy loam soils often with lateritic gravel. The bulk of the population is found from around Wongan Hills and Mukinbudin in the north down to around Pingelly and Hyden in the south with disjunct populations around Geraldton.

See also
List of Acacia species

References

tratmaniana
Acacias of Western Australia
Plants described in 1904
Taxa named by William Vincent Fitzgerald